"Rearrange" is a song by the band God Lives Underwater. It was released on their album Life in the So-Called Space Age in 1998. A single was released as a promotional CD (consisting of "Rearrange" and "Rearrange (Example 1)") and also as an EP CD.

Track listing
 Rearrange (Example 1) (7:22)
 From Your Mouth (Chris Vrenna Remix) (4:28)
 Hush That Noise (3:07)
 From Your Mouth (Mass Hystereo Remix) (5:01)
 Rearrange (Example 2) (7:18)

References

God Lives Underwater songs
1998 singles
1998 songs
A&M Records singles